Psophometric weighting refers to any weighting curve used in the measurement of noise. In the field of audio engineering it has a more specific meaning, referring to noise weightings used especially in measuring noise on telecommunications circuits. Key standards are ITU-T O.41 and C-message weighting as shown here.

Use 

A major use of noise weighting is in the measurement of residual noise in audio equipment, usually present as hiss or hum in quiet moments of programme material. The purpose of weighting here is to emphasise the parts of the audible spectrum that ears perceive most readily, and attenuate the parts that contribute less to perception of loudness, in order to get a measured figure that correlates well with subjective effect.

See also 
Audio quality measurement
Equal-loudness contour
Fletcher–Munson curves
Noise measurement
Headroom
Psophometric voltage
Rumble measurement
ITU-R 468 noise weighting
A-weighting
Weighting filter
Weighting
Weighting curve

References 

Noise (electronics)